The 2019 Big West Conference men's soccer tournament, was the 12th edition of the tournament. It determined the Big West Conference's automatic berth to the 2019 NCAA Division I men's soccer tournament.

UC Davis won the Big West Tournament, giving the program their first ever Big West title, and their first berth into the NCAA Tournament since 2008. UC Davis defeated UCSB in the final, 2–0. UC Davis senior forward, Adam Mickelson, was named the tournament's Most valuable player.

In addition to UC Davis, UCSB earned a berth in the NCAA Tournament. UC Davis earned their first ever national seeding and second round bye into the tournament, being seeded 14th overall. UC Davis were eliminated in the Second Round by Louisville, losing 1–0. UCSB won their first three NCAA Tournament games before losing to Wake Forest in the Quarterfinals.

Seeds

Bracket

Results

Quarterfinals

Semifinals

Final

References

External links 
 2019 Big West Men's Soccer Tournament Central

Big West Conference Men's Soccer Tournament
2019 Big West Conference men's soccer season